Nuria Sánchez García (born 30 March 1987) is a Spanish former professional tennis player.

Sánchez García has career-high WTA rankings of 450 in singles, achieved on 19 March 2007, and 257 in doubles, set on 2 April 2007. She won one singles title and eight doubles titles on the ITF Women's Circuit. Her only WTA Tour main-draw appearance came at the 2007 Barcelona KIA, where she partnered Neuza Silva in the doubles event.

ITF finals

Singles (1 title, 1 runner–up)

Doubles (8 titles, 2 runner–ups)

References

External links
 
 

1987 births
Living people
Spanish female tennis players